The 2019 Nigerian Senate election in Osun State was held on February 23, 2019, to elect members of the Nigerian Senate to represent Osun State. Adelere Adeyemi Oriolowo representing Osun West and Ajibola Basiru representing Osun Central won on the platform of All Progressives Congress, while Francis Adenigba Fadahunsi representing Osun East won on the platform of Peoples Democratic Party.

Overview

Summary

Results

Osun West 
A total of 20 candidates registered with the Independent National Electoral Commission to contest in the election. APC candidate Adelere Adeyemi Oriolowo won the election, defeating PDP Oyewunmi Kamorudeen Olalere and 18 other party candidates. Oriolowo received 41.38% of the votes, while Olalere received 39.40%.

Osun Central 
A total of 25 candidates registered with the Independent National Electoral Commission to contest in the election. APC candidate Ajibola Basiru won the election, defeating PDP Olaoluwa Ayobami Ganiyu and 23 other party candidates. Basiru received 54.33% of the votes, while Ganiyu received 43.67%.

Osun East 
A total of 23 candidates registered with the Independent National Electoral Commission to contest in the election. PDP candidate Francis Adenigba Fadahunsi won the election, defeating APC Famurewa Israel Ajibola and 21 other party candidates. Fadahunsi received 50.49% of the votes, while Ajibola received 46.47%.

References 

Osun State senatorial elections
Osun State Senate elections